Welcome to Durham, USA is a documentary about gang violence in Durham, North Carolina.

Synopsis 
Welcome to Durham, USA shows how gangs are not only a problem in big cities, but also in smaller cities and towns. It shows how the rivalry between the Crips and the Bloods are spreading out far beyond big cities.

Post release 
Welcome to Durham, USA won the Best Documentary Award at the New York International Film Festival. The soundtrack for the film includes the single "Welcome 2 Durham" by Butta Team featuring Big Daddy Kane and Little Brother produced by Grammy Award Winner 9th Wonder.

External links

2007 films
2007 documentary films
American documentary films
History of Durham, North Carolina
Documentary films about African-American gangs
2000s English-language films
2000s American films